Manuel de Sousa known as Casoto, was a Portuguese footballer who played as a goalkeeper.

External links 
 
 

Portuguese footballers
Association football goalkeepers
Boavista F.C. players
Portugal international footballers
Place of birth missing
1906 births
1955 deaths